Andrew Tarbell (born October 7, 1993) is an American professional soccer player who plays as a goalkeeper for Major League Soccer side Houston Dynamo.

Career

College
Tarbell spent his entire college career at Clemson University. He started all 55 games during his four-year career with the Tigers and led them to an ACC Tournament title in 2014 and was named to the All-ACC First team.  In 2015, Tarbell led the Tigers to the National Title game, where they lost to Stanford.  He was also named to the all ACC First team and led the ACC with 84 saves.

Professional
Andrew Tarbell was drafted in the 8th position of the 2016 MLS SuperDraft by the San Jose Earthquakes. Tarbell signed a Generation Adidas contract with the Earthquakes.  He made his professional debut on August 28 in a match against Columbus Crew, coming on as a halftime sub for David Bingham who suffered a back injury. The match ended in a 2–0 loss.

Tarbell appeared on loan with San Jose's United Soccer League affiliate Reno 1868 FC.

Tarbell made a career-high eleven saves in San Jose's U.S. Open Cup semifinal loss against Sporting Kansas City, in addition to saving Benny Feilhaber's penalty during sudden death, on August 9, 2017. He played all four of San Jose's Open Cup matches in 2017. This performance earned him his first MLS start three days later on August 12 against the Houston Dynamo at BBVA Compass Stadium, in which he saved a second penalty, this time from Cubo Torres. He also won MLS Save of the Week for saving a shot taken by Romell Quioto in this same match, announced on August 18. Tarbell was announced as a nominee for the MLS Goalkeeper of the Year Award on October 14, 2017.

Tarbell made his debut for the Columbus Crew in the 2020 MLS is Back Tournament.

Tarbell's contract optioned was declined by Columbus following their 2020 season.

On December 23, 2020, Tarbell signed with Austin FC ahead of their inaugural season in 2021.  He made his debut for Austin on September 29, 2021 in a 3-0 loss away to the Colorado Rapids.

Tarbell was released by Austin following their 2022 season. On November 23, 2022, Tarbell signed a two-year deal with Houston Dynamo ahead of the 2023 season.

Statistics

Honours
Columbus Crew
 MLS Cup: 2020

References

External links

San Jose Earthquakes player profile
Clemson Tigers bio

1993 births
Living people
American soccer players
Clemson Tigers men's soccer players
New Orleans Jesters players
San Jose Earthquakes players
Reno 1868 FC players
Columbus Crew players
Austin FC players
Houston Dynamo FC players
Association football goalkeepers
Soccer players from Louisiana
San Jose Earthquakes draft picks
USL League Two players
Major League Soccer players
USL Championship players
People from Mandeville, Louisiana